Enrique Esteban Delgado (born December 26, 1955) is a Peruvian prelate of the Roman Catholic Church who has been serving as an auxiliary bishop for the Archdiocese of Miami in Florida since 2017.

Biography
Enrique Delgado was born on December 26, 1955, in Lima, Peru.  On June 29, 1996, he  was ordained to the priesthood for the Archdiocese of Miami by Auxiliary Bishop Agustín Alejo Román Rodríguez

Pope Francis appointed Delgado as an auxiliary bishop for the Archdiocese of Miami on October 12, 2017.  On December 7, 2017, Delgado was consecrated as a bishop by Archbishop Thomas Wenski.

See also

 Catholic Church hierarchy
 Catholic Church in the United States
 Historical list of the Catholic bishops of the United States
 List of Catholic bishops of the United States
 Lists of patriarchs, archbishops, and bishops

References

External links
Roman Catholic Archdiocese of Miami Official Site

Episcopal succession

 

1955 births 
Living people
Clergy from Lima
21st-century Peruvian Roman Catholic priests
21st-century Roman Catholic bishops in the United States
Bishops appointed by Pope Francis